Krystin Pellerin (born July 12, 1983) is a Canadian actress of theatre, television, and film.

Early life
Pellerin was born and raised in St. John's, Newfoundland. After attending high school at Prince of Wales Collegiate and attending Memorial University of Newfoundland, she was selected to attend the National Theatre School of Canada in Montreal, Quebec.

Career
Following her graduation she was cast in her first season at Soulpepper Theatre in Toronto, Ontario. Her first professional play was Soulpepper's production of Tom Stoppard's The Real Thing, playing the role of Debbie opposite Megan Follows, Albert Schultz, and C. David Johnson. In it she played the rebellious daughter to Albert Schultz's Henry. She has returned to Soulpepper every season since, playing a variety of leading and supporting characters in numerous productions.

Her first film was Killing Zelda Sparks, in which she starred opposite Mad Men'''s Vincent Kartheiser, and in her second film she appeared opposite Edward Furlong in Warriors of Terra. She made her television debut on the second season of The Tudors as Lady Elizabeth Darrell alongside Jonathan Rhys Meyers, where she spent five months filming in Dublin, Ireland. Her first featured role in television brought her home to St. John's, playing the role of Sergeant Leslie Bennett in CBC Television's Republic of Doyle''.

Filmography

References

External links
 

1983 births
Living people
21st-century Canadian actresses
Actresses from Newfoundland and Labrador
Canadian film actresses
Canadian stage actresses
Canadian television actresses
Memorial University of Newfoundland alumni
National Theatre School of Canada alumni
People from St. John's, Newfoundland and Labrador